Haidar Najim  (born 1 July 1967) is a former Iraqi football forward who played for Iraq in the 1998 FIFA World Cup qualification and 2002 FIFA World Cup qualification. He played for the national team between 1997 and 2001.

Honours

Club 
Al-Najaf
 Iraqi Elite Cup: 1997

Career statistics

International goals
Scores and results list Iraq's goal tally first.

References

Iraqi footballers
Iraq international footballers
Living people
1967 births
Association football forwards
Iraqi expatriate footballers
Expatriate footballers in Qatar
Iraqi expatriate sportspeople in Qatar
Expatriate footballers in Lebanon
Iraqi expatriate sportspeople in Lebanon
Tadamon Sour SC players
Lebanese Premier League players